Sarang Kheda Dam is an earthfill dam on Tapi River near Sarengkheda village in the state of Maharashtra in India. The dam's purpose is irrigation.

Specifications

See also
 Dams in Maharashtra
 List of reservoirs and dams in India

References

Dams in Maharashtra
Year of establishment missing